Agathe de La Boulaye is a French film and television actress. She played Adele Rousseau in 2004 science fiction film Alien vs. Predator. In 2008 she played quadriplegic psychiatrist Claire Etxebarra in the television series Disparitions, retour aux sources.

Filmography
Jefferson in Paris (1995) as card player
Highlander: The Raven (1999) as Christina — TV series; 1 episode
La Crim' (1999–2001) as Caroline Tessier — TV series; 13 episodes
The Girl (2000) as The Artist
Largo Winch (2001) as Diana Murray — TV series; 2 episodes
Michel Vaillant (2003) as Gabrielle Spangenberg
Alien vs. Predator (2004) as Adele Rousseau
The Last Drop (2005) as Katrina
Dying God (2008) as Angel
Disparitions, retour aux sources (2008) as Claire Etxebarra — TV series; 10 episodes

References

External links
Official site

French film actresses
Living people
Actresses from Paris
French television actresses
21st-century French actresses
1972 births